Charlie Kapp is a former German curler.

He is a former European men's curling champion, German men's curling champion (1989) and two-time German mixed curling champion (1989, 1990).

His sons Andy Kapp and Uli Kapp are well-known German curlers too.

Teams

Men's

Mixed

References

External links
 

Living people
German male curlers
European curling champions
German curling champions

Year of birth missing (living people)
Place of birth missing (living people)
20th-century German people